Inishmacsaint is a monastery located on an island off the western shore of Lough Erne, County Fermanagh, Northern Ireland. The site includes the ruins of a monastic church and an early stone cross, probably from the tenth and twelfth centuries. Inishmacsaint was founded by St. Ninnidh, (d. 523/30). The original monastic buildings were probably damaged or destroyed during the raids of the ninth or tenth centuries.

Saints associated with Inishmacsaint Abbey
 Saint Ninnidh, feast day 18 January

Abbotts of Inishmacsaint Abbey
 Fiannamail: c. 718

References 

Buildings and structures in County Fermanagh